Lough Nacung Upper (Irish: Loch na Cuinge Uachtarach, meaning 'Upper Narrowness Lake' or 'Upper Lake of the Isthmus'), also known as Upper Lough Nacung, is a lough in Gaoth Dobhair, a district in the north-west of County Donegal in Ulster, the northern province in Ireland. It connects Lough Dunlewey to Lough Nacung Lower, which drains into the Clady River.
Lough Nacung is a Special Area of Conservation.

The name is derived from the Irish cuing, meaning 'Lake of the Isthmus' or 'narrow neck of land (as between two lakes)'.

Wildlife
The main fish species are sea trout and salmon.

See also 
 List of loughs in Ireland

References 

Lakes of County Donegal